John Rudling (b.August 31, 1907-d.December 18, 1983) was an English actor active on both stage and screen who was perhaps best known for playing the butler Brabinger in the popular BBC sitcom To the Manor Born.

Biography and television roles 
John Rudling was born in South Norwood, near Croydon, in South London, and was a qualified draughtsman before making his mark as a character actor, beginning with the RSC. He moved on to work at the Players' Theatre, London, before touring with ENSA. He worked in repertory as an accomplished actor and director until film and television work came his way. He was a member of the company at the Theatre Royal, York, for many years. He appeared in the Ealing comedy films. He appeared on television in a number of TV programmes such as The Invisible Man in 1959, Porridge in 1975, Wodehouse Playhouse, The Fall and Rise of Reginald Perrin, The Liver Birds and The Two Ronnies. He also played a prison officer called Mr. Birchwood in Porridge in an episode entitled 'Just Desserts'. One of his final TV appearances was in 1982 in Ronnie Corbett's sitcom Sorry!.

On television Rudling is best known for playing Brabinger, the aged and dedicated butler in To the Manor Born. Whilst appearing in To the Manor Born he suffered a heart attack. He was absent for several episodes after the heart attack but returned in the episode "The Honours List". He died in 1983 from respiratory complications.

Early television (1936–1939)

Rudling was an early player in the fledgling BBC television, which started in November 1936 until it was closed at the beginning of the War.

Selected filmography
 Night and the City (1950) – Man (uncredited)
 The Man in the White Suit (1951) – Wilson
 The Titfield Thunderbolt (1953) – Clegg
 The Ladykillers (1955) – Nervous Man (uncredited)
 Law and Disorder (1958) – Man in train
 Journey to Murder (1971) – Hodgson (The Killing Bottle)

References

External links
 

1907 births
1983 deaths
English male television actors
20th-century English male actors